Jasper Good  (born 10 May 1996) is an American Nordic combined skier.

He competed at the 2018 Winter Olympics. He also competed at the 2022 Winter Olympics.

Personnel life
Good was selected into the U.S. Army World Class Athlete Program and is a specialist with the Utah National Guard.

References

External links

1996 births
Living people
American male Nordic combined skiers 
American military Olympians
Olympic Nordic combined skiers of the United States 
Nordic combined skiers at the 2018 Winter Olympics 
Nordic combined skiers at the 2022 Winter Olympics
United States Army soldiers
Utah National Guard personnel